Sviridov is a rural locality (a khutor) in Vysoksky Selsoviet Rural Settlement, Medvensky District, Kursk Oblast, Russia. Population:

Geography 
The khutor is located in the Reut River basin (a left tributary of the Seym), 62 km from the Russia–Ukraine border, 30 km south-west of Kursk, 8.5 km north-west of the district center – the urban-type settlement Medvenka, 4 km from the selsoviet center – Vysokoye.

 Climate
Sviridov has a warm-summer humid continental climate (Dfb in the Köppen climate classification).

Transport 
Sviridov is located 5.5 km from the federal route  Crimea Highway (a part of the European route ), 14 km from the road of regional importance  (Dyakonovo – Sudzha – border with Ukraine), 1 km from the road  (M2 Crimea Highway – 38K-004), 2 km from the road of intermunicipal significance  (38K-009 – Vysokoye), on the road  (38N-204 – Sviridov), 21 km from the nearest railway station Dyakonovo (railway line Lgov I — Kursk).

The rural locality is situated 38 km from Kursk Vostochny Airport, 98 km from Belgorod International Airport and 227 km from Voronezh Peter the Great Airport.

References

Notes

Sources

Rural localities in Medvensky District